Edward Carteret (1671–1739) was an English politician and served as Postmaster General from 1721 until his death.

Life
Edward Carteret was the third son of Philip Carteret FRS of Hawnes and younger brother of George Carteret, 1st Baron Carteret. He was educated at Brentwood School and Trinity College, Cambridge.

Carteret was returned  as Member of Parliament for Huntingdon in 1698 and for Bedford in 1702. He was returned as MP for Bere Alston at a by-election on 9 December 1717 and resigned in 1720 when he was made Postmaster General. He was Joint Postmaster General from 1721 to 1732, Postmaster General from 1732 to 1733 and Joint Postmaster General again from 1732  to his death.

Carteret  died from the stone, suddenly on 15 April 1739. He had married, in 1699, Bridget, the daughter of Sir Thomas Exton, M.P., Dean of the Arches court of Canterbury and judge of the Admiralty. They had 3 sons and 3 daughters.

References

Person Sheet

1671 births
1739 deaths
Alumni of Trinity College, Cambridge
United Kingdom Postmasters General
English MPs 1698–1700
English MPs 1702–1705
Members of the Parliament of Great Britain for Bere Alston
British MPs 1715–1722
Members of the Parliament of England (pre-1707) for constituencies in Huntingdonshire